Chronoperates (meaning "time wanderer" in Greek) is an extinct genus of mammal whose remains have been found in a late Paleocene deposit in Alberta, Canada. It is represented by the type species Chronoperates paradoxus and known only from a partial left lower jaw. It was first identified in 1992 as a non-mammalian cynodont, implying a ghost lineage of over 100 million years since the previously youngest known record of non-mammalian cynodonts, which at that time was in the Jurassic period (some non-mammalian cynodonts are now known to have persisted until the Early Cretaceous). Subsequent authors have challenged this interpretation, particularly as the teeth do not resemble any known non-mammalian cynodonts. Chronoperates is now generally considered to be more likely to be a late-surviving symmetrodont mammal. This would still infer a ghost lineage for symmetrodonts, but a more plausible one, as symmetrodonts persisted into the Late Cretaceous.

References

http://darrennaish.blogspot.com/2006/05/time-wandering-cynodonts-and-docodonts.html
https://web.archive.org/web/20081219051716/http://www.palaeos.com/Vertebrates/Units/410Cynodontia/410.400.html

Symmetrodonta
Prehistoric mammals of North America
Paleocene mammals
Fossil taxa described in 1992
Taxa named by Richard C. Fox
Taxa named by Gordon P. Youzwyshyn
Taxa named by David W. Krause
Prehistoric mammal genera

Species known from a single specimen